Love Me for a Reason is the sixth studio album by The Osmonds, released in 1974. The album peaked at No. 47 on the Billboard Top LPs chart.  Two singles were released from the album: the title track "Love Me for a Reason" (No. 1 UK, No. 10 US) and "Having a Party" (No. 28 UK).

After a string of three albums (Phase III, Crazy Horses and The Plan) in which the Osmonds performed mostly their own material and focused on rock music, Love Me for a Reason consisted mostly of the work of professional songwriters, most prominently H. B. Barnum, who arranged all of the songs on the album and co-wrote three. The title track in particular was aimed at the easy listening market, continuing a string of easy listening hits for the quintet (it peaked at No. 2 on the Billboard easy listening chart). The retrenchment, reuniting with former producer Mike Curb, and focus on pop was an effort to regain some popularity the group had lost in 1973, driven by brief but intense competition from The DeFranco Family, Donny's voice changing, and the less commercially friendly content of The Plan.

Track listing

Personnel
Producer: Mike Curb
Arranger: H.B. Barnum
Engineer: Ed Greene
Bass Guitar: Merrill Osmond
Drums/Percussion: Jay Osmond
Guitar/Woodwind: Wayne Osmond
Piano/Guitar: Alan Osmond
Synthesizer: Donny Osmond

Charts

Album

Singles

Certifications

References

1974 albums
The Osmonds albums
Albums arranged by H. B. Barnum
Albums produced by Mike Curb
MGM Records albums